A jet fighter is a jet engine-powered military aircraft designed for air-to-air combat.

Jet fighter(s) or Jetfighter(s) may also refer to:
 Jet Fighter (video game) (1975), 2 player arcade game by Atari
 Jetfighter (series) (1988), 3D combat flight simulator computer games from Velocity Development

See also
 Jet (disambiguation)
 Fighter (disambiguation)
 List of fighter aircraft
 Jet aircraft